Doi Inthanon is the highest mountain in Thailand. It is in Chom Thong District, Chiang Mai Province. This mountain is an ultra prominent peak, known in the past as Doi Luang ('big mountain') or Doi Ang Ga, meaning the 'crow's pond top'. Near the mountain's base was a pond where many crows gathered. The name Doi Inthanon was given in honour of Inthawichayanon, last King of Chiang Mai, who was concerned about the forests in the north and tried to preserve them. He ordered that, after his death, his remains be interred at Doi Luang, which was then renamed in his honour.

Today, the summit of Doi Inthanon is a popular tourist destination for both foreign and Thai tourists, with a peak of 12,000 visitors visiting the summit on New Year's Day. In addition to a range of tourist facilities on the summit, there is also a Royal Thai Air Force weather radar station at the summit and the Thai National Observatory (TNO) at km44.

Geography
Doi Inthanon is the highest peak of the Inthanon Range of the Thanon Thong Chai Range, a subrange of the Shan Hills in the Thai highlands stretching southwards from the Daen Lao Range. This range, the southwesternmost of the Shan Highland system, separates the Salween watershed from the Mekong watershed. Other high peaks of the Daen Lao Range are Doi Luang Chiang Dao, Doi Pui, and Doi Suthep.

In 1954, the forests around Doi Inthanon were conserved, creating Doi Inthanon National Park, as one of the original 14 national parks of Thailand. Given the varied climatic and ecological areas regions, the park supports a range of animal species, including over 360 bird species.

On the lower slopes of Doi Inthanon, near the Karen hill tribe village, Ban Sop Had, are the Wachirathan waterfalls, where the Wachirathan (lit. "Diamond Creek") tumbles over a granite escarpment.

Climate 
The climate is typically tropical and fairly cool on the summit of Doi Inthanon. From March to June, temperatures are pleasant, especially at higher altitudes. The rainy season runs from April to November, when it sometimes rains for more than two hours per day.

Geology
Geologically the mountain is a granite batholith in a north-south oriented mountain range.

Environmental issues
In 2014, visitors to the mountain left behind  of rubbish.

Places 
 On the main road to the summit of Doi Inthanon stand two adjacent chedis, one called Naphamethinidon (นภเมทินีดล), meaning 'by the strength of the land and air', and the other, Naphaphonphumisiri (นภพลภูมิสิริ), meaning 'being the strength of the air and the grace of the land'. These temples were built to honor the 60th birthday anniversary of King Bhumibol Adulyadej in 1987, and the 60th birthday anniversary of Queen Sirikit in 1992, respectively.
 Kio Mae Pan Nature Trail
 The Inthanon Royal Project Research Station: The agricultural station was a King Bhumibol Adulyadej project to help eliminate opium cultivation. It contains a rhododendron garden, and greenhouses for growing ferns, flowering plants, and vegetables.

Gallery

See also
 List of mountains in Thailand
 List of Southeast Asian mountains
 List of Ultras of Southeast Asia
 Doi Inthanon rock frog
 List of elevation extremes by country

References

External links

 
 thaibirding.com on Doi Inthanon
 www.DoiInthanon.net
 "Doi Inthanon, Thailand" on Peakbagger

Mountains of Thailand
Thanon Thong Chai Range
Geography of Chiang Mai province
Two-thousanders of Asia
Highest points of countries